Tenny may refer to:

People
Elissa Tenny, American academic
William Tenny, American baseball player
Tenny Blount, American sports executive
Tenny Edwards, American baseball player
Tenny Manalo, wife of Filipino church leader Eraño Manalo
Tenny Palepoi, American football player
Tenny Svensson, Swedish tennis player
Tenny Wright, American film director
Tenny Wyss, Swiss swimmer

Other uses
Tenny River, United States

See also
Tenné, a shade of orange
Tennies, a slang term for athletic shoes